Beyond This Horizon is a science fiction novel by American writer Robert A. Heinlein. It was originally published as a two-part serial in Astounding Science Fiction (April, May 1942, under the pseudonym Anson MacDonald) and then as a single volume by Fantasy Press in 1948. It was awarded a Retro-Hugo award for best novel in 2018.

Overview
The novel depicts a world in which genetic selection for increased health, longevity, and intelligence has become so widespread that the unmodified "control naturals" are a carefully managed and protected minority. Duels and the carrying of arms are socially accepted ways of maintaining civility in public. A man can wear distinctive clothing to show his unwillingness to duel, but this results in an inferior social status. The world has become an economic utopia; the "economic dividend" is so high that work has become optional. The chief economic problem uses up the economic surplus: many high-quality goods actually cost less than those of lower quality. Many people use lower-quality goods as status symbols. The government invests heavily in scientific research, but it has the side effect of further increasing productivity a decade or more later, and so long-term projects with no expected economic return are favored above anything but medical research, on the theory that longer lifespans will consume more surplus.

The story's protagonist, Hamilton Felix (surname first), is the archetypal übermensch. He is the penultimate step in a "star line" designed to breed for the highest-quality human characteristics. However, he lacks eidetic memory, which disqualifies him for what many consider to be humanity's most important occupation: that of an "encyclopedic synthesist", who analyzes the sum total of human knowledge for untapped potential. As such, he finds his life and the society in which he lives to be enjoyable but meaningless. However, when one of the synthesists seeks him out and inquires when he plans to continue his line, he finds himself drawn into an adventure that gives him purpose and also convinces him that his society is worth saving after all.

Major themes in the novel are reincarnation, the immortality of the soul, and telepathy. Felix is the product of generations of genetic engineering. He is almost but not quite the perfect human. In the second half of the book, his genetically engineered son is born, the climax of generations of genetic engineering and selective breeding and a genetically perfect human. As the son grows, he begins to develop almost-superhuman mental abilities and a surprising telepathic ability.

As the novel draws to a close, it becomes apparent that the son senses that Hamiton Felix's second child, a daughter, is the reincarnation of a wise elderly government official, who foresaw her own death and arranged to die shortly before Felix's daughter was born. The official understood that the soul is reincarnated, and in preparation for her own death and reincarnation, she was instrumental in the genetic engineering of the son and the daughter.

Reception
Anthony Boucher and J. Francis McComas characterized Beyond This Horizon as among "the finest science fiction novels of the modern crop". P. Schuyler Miller reviewed the novel favorably, saying: "in true Heinlein manner the basic theme of the book smashes the screen of action only in the closing pages".

In popular culture
In the Japanese visual novel Eden*, the term "Felix" is used in the setting to refer to genetically engineered humans with abilities similar to those described in the book, and the connection to Heinlein's work is referred to in dialogue.

Mordan Claude’s quote "An armed society is a polite society" is often cited by pro-gun groups in justifying the proposal of universal carrying of arms. The context of the quote is usually omitted, though:

See also
 For Us, The Living: A Comedy of Customs

References

External links 
 
 

1942 American novels
1942 science fiction novels
Novels by Robert A. Heinlein
Novels first published in serial form
Economics in fiction
Eugenics in fiction
Works originally published in Analog Science Fiction and Fact
Social science fiction
Novels about genetic engineering
Novels about telepathy
Novels about reincarnation
Fantasy Press books